The Ghost Train is a 1941 British mystery thriller film directed by Walter Forde based on the 1923 play of the same name written by Arnold Ridley.

Plot
Tommy Gander (Arthur Askey), a vaudeville comedian, pulls the communication cord on a GWR express train, bringing it to a stop so he can retrieve his hat. Returning to the train, he escapes an angry conductor by ducking into a compartment occupied by attractive blonde Jackie Winthrop (Carole Lynne), with whom Gander flirts. Another passenger, Teddy (Richard Murdoch), has his eye on Jackie as well, but her companion Richard Winthrop (Peter Murray-Hill) ejects both of them from the compartment.

When the train stops at Fal Vale Junction, Cornwall, these four get off to change trains, as do Herbert (Stuart Latham) and his fiancée Edna (Betty Jardine), spinster Miss Bourne (Kathleen Harrison), and the tippling Dr. Sterling (Morland Graham). However, the stationmaster, Saul Hodgkin (Herbert Lomas) tells them the last Truro-bound train has gone, and that they cannot remain at the station, as he is locking up for the night. The passengers insist on staying, as it is raining heavily and the nearest village is four miles away.

Hodgkin warns them the station is haunted. A branch line once crossed the river on a swing bridge close to the station. One night 43 years ago, then stationmaster Ted Holmes had a fatal heart attack while attempting to close the bridge, causing a train to plunge into the river. Ever since, a phantom train has been heard periodically on the abandoned track. It is said to kill anyone who looks upon it.

With that, he reluctantly leaves them. As the passengers make themselves as comfortable as they can, they hear footsteps outside. Richard opens the door, and Hodgkin collapses into the room. Dr. Sterling pronounces him dead. Later, a terrified young woman in black (Linden Travers) appears. She, Julia, pleads for help, saying that someone is pursuing her. A car spins off the road and crashes into a tree. The driver is unhurt, but his car is damaged. Back in the waiting room, he introduces himself as John Price (Raymond Huntley) and explains that he is searching for his sister Julia, who he says suffers from delusions. Julia protests that he is lying. Price further explains that she thought she had seen the ghost train, and became obsessed with it ever since. The passengers tell him that Hodgkin has died. When Price insists on seeing the body, they discover it has mysteriously vanished.

Price leaves to arrange transportation. Then an approaching train is heard. As it thunders past, Julia smashes a window to look at it, then screams and faints. They hear singing from the nearby railway tunnel mouth. Julia claims that Ben Isaacs (D. J. Williams), the sole survivor of the accident, is coming back. Teddy shoots at the "ghost", causing it to flee back into the tunnel, leaving behind a bloodstained cloth.

Teddy shows the others the cloth and orders the others, at gunpoint, to stay put until the police arrive, but Richard punches him, knocking him out. The passengers carry him to the bus Price has obtained. When Teddy comes to, he is furious with Richard, as now there will be no one to intercept the train on its return journey. When Gander remarks that he had returned the bridge to the open position, Dr. Sterling suddenly orders the bus driver to stop, while his confederate, Price, produces his own gun. Sterling orders the driver to turn back so they can warn the train.

Meanwhile, guns are being loaded aboard the "ghost train"; a very much alive Hodgkin flags the train off and climbs aboard. Teddy explains that the train is really being used by Nazi fifth columnists to secretly transport arms. While Price heads down the embankment with Julia and the driver to try to stop the train, Teddy knocks Sterling out and gains control of the situation. The train plunges into the river.

Cast
Arthur Askey as Tommy Gander
Richard Murdoch as Teddy Deakin
Kathleen Harrison as Miss Bourne
Peter Murray-Hill as R. G. Winthrop
Carole Lynne as Jackie Winthrop
Morland Graham as Dr. Sterling
Betty Jardine as Edna
Stuart Latham as Herbert
Herbert Lomas as Saul Hodgkin
Raymond Huntley as John Price
Linden Travers as Julia Price
D. J. Williams as Ben Isaacs
 George Merritt as Inspector 
 Sidney Monckton as Train Guard
 Wallace Bosco as Ted Holmes
 William Thomas Jones as the chauffeur

Production
The first sound film version was released in 1931 with Jack Hulbert. The Askey version was announced in August 1939. The script had to be rewritten to accommodate Askey; the actions of Hulbert's part were divided between the comic star and Richard Murdoch.

Filming did not proceed immediately; in January 1941 reports said Carol Reed would direct and Edward Black would produce. Eventually the job of directing went to Walter Forde who had made the earlier sound version.

Filming began in February 1941. It was an early role for Carole Lynn who had been discovered dancing on the West End. Shooting took place at the Lime Grove Studios in Shepherd's Bush, with sets designed by the art director Alex Vetchinsky. Some location shots were also taken around Teignmouth and Dawlish Warren in Devon.

Reviews
The Monthly Film Bulletin  described it as "a classy thriller".

Sight & Sound called it "funnier and more ghostly than the original".

In the 21st century, TV Guide.com noted the film was "good for a few laughs and a couple of chilling surprises."

Soundtrack
Arthur Askey – "The Seaside Band" (Written by Kenneth Blain)  –  (UK DECCA F 9944 10" 78 rpm shellac PICTURE LABELS)

References

External links

The Ghost Train at TCMDB

1940s comedy horror films
1940s mystery thriller films
1941 horror films
British comedy horror films
British black-and-white films
British films based on plays
Films directed by Walter Forde
Films set in Cornwall
Gainsborough Pictures films
Rail transport films
Films with screenplays by Marriott Edgar
British mystery thriller films
1941 comedy films
1941 films
Films scored by Walter Goehr
1940s English-language films
1940s British films